Beautiful Boy may refer to:

Music
 "Beautiful Boy (Darling Boy)", a 1980 song by John Lennon from Double Fantasy
 "Beautiful Boys", a 1980 song by Yoko Ono, also from Double Fantasy
 "Beautiful Boy", a song by Kelli Ali from Tigermouth
 "Beautiful Boy", a song by Nate Borofsky from Never Enough Time
 "Beautiful Boy", a song by Karol G from KG0516
 "Beautiful Boy", a song from the 2005 musical Lestat

Other media
 Beautiful Boy (2010 film), a 2010 drama directed by Shawn Ku
 Beautiful Boy (2018 film), a 2018 film directed by Felix van Groeningen
 The Beautiful Boy (or The Boy), a 2003 book by Germaine Greer
 Beautiful Boy: A Father's Journey Through His Son's Addiction, a 2008 book by David Sheff

See also 
 Beautiful Boyz, a 2004 EP by CocoRosie
 Bishōnen (lit. "beautiful boy"), a Japanese term for an aesthetic of male sexual appeal
 Vackra pojke! (Beautiful Boy!), a 1981 album by Pink Champagne